Amalia  is a 1914  Argentine silent film directed by Enrique García Velloso and written by Eugenio Py. It was based on the novel by José Mármol. The film starred Dora Huergo and Lola Marcó del Pont. It is the first full-length fiction film ever produced in Argentine cinema history.

Cast
Dora Huergo as La Negra
Lola Marcó del Pont as Señora Dupasquier

See also
Amalia (1936 film)

References

External links

1914 films
Argentine silent films
1910s Spanish-language films
Argentine black-and-white films
Works about the Argentine Civil War